Psoglav (literally "doghead") is a demonic mythical creature in Balkan mythology; belief about it existed in parts of Bosnia and  Montenegro. Psoglav was described as having a human body with horse legs, a dog's head with iron teeth, and a single eye on the forehead.

Psoglavs were described to live in caves or in a dark land which has plenty of gemstones, but no sun. They practice anthropophagy, by eating people, or even digging out corpses from graves to eat them. In Croatian the term is psoglavac, and in Slovene it is psoglavec. There are numerous legends about them, particularly on the Istrian peninsula in Croatia.

See also

 Cynocephaly
 Ghoul

References

Slavic demons
Slavic legendary creatures
Serbian mythology
Mythological monsters
Mythological dogs